Eastern Commerce Collegiate Institute (ECCI) was a public high school part of Toronto District School Board in Toronto, Ontario, Canada. Opened in 1925, it offered a range of courses leading to all Ministry pathways: University, College, Apprenticeship, and Workplace. Co-operative Education is an integral part of the curriculum. 

The school offered a Specialist High Skills Major in Business and Marketing, The National Retail Business Certificate, and an internationally recognized Computer Licence Certificate. In 2002, the department won the Kenneth Fryer Award for mathematics teaching.

The school attracted enrollment to students from all parts of Toronto due to its proximity to Donlands station. Since the school's closure in 2015, the building still hosts Subway Academy I, the First Nations School and the TDSB Historical and Archival Records.

History

The school opened in 1924 and was designed by architect Charles Edmund Cyril Dyson
The school closed down in June 2015.

See also
List of high schools in Ontario

References

External links 
Official Website
Eastern Commerce Collegiate Institute at the Toronto District School Board website

High schools in Toronto
Schools in the TDSB
Educational institutions established in 1925
Educational institutions disestablished in 2015
1925 establishments in Ontario
2015 disestablishments in Ontario